The Military College of Signals, also known as MCS, is a military school located in Rawalpindi, Punjab, Pakistan. It is a constituent college of the NUST, Islamabad. MCS consists of two engineering departments, EE & CSE. The college puts a strong emphasis on scientific and technological education and research.

It is located in the heart of Rawalpindi on Humayun Road (Lalkurti) and Adiala Road, close to the Pakistan Army's GHQ and CMH.

History

Military College of Signals was raised immediately after partition of the Indo-Pak Subcontinent in 1947 as "School of Signals", with the task of training officers and selected Non-Commissioned Officers of the Corps of Signals of Pakistan Army. The School had to be raised from a scratch because the signal training facilities of undivided British Indian Army were located either at Poona or Jabalpur which became a part of India at the time of independence. Lt Col C.W.M. Young, a British officer of the Royal Corps of Signals was the first commandant of the school. During the early years, due to the shortage of training facilities in the country in the field of telecommunication, a number of officers were trained at School of Signals, UK and subsequently at US Army Signal School at Fort Monmouth, New Jersey. The college, since its raising has undergone various phases of expansion to meet the requirements of the Corps of Signals.

The status of the school was raised to that of a college in 1977 when it was affiliated with University of Engineering and Technology, Lahore for Telecommunication Engineering degree program.

The college became a constituent campus of National University of Sciences and Technology in 1991 and since then it has progressed phenomenally as a center of quality education. Today the curriculum is not only confined to merely undergraduate level but also MS and PhD level.

Campus life
The college has kept military traditions alive. Military rules are applied and National University of Sciences and Technology, Pakistan (NUST) policy is followed too. It provides opportunities to participate in a variety of co-curricular activities. There are students' societies and clubs which organize different activities. Presently, the college has two societies. Both were established in June 2001.
Telecom Society comprises the President, General Secretary, Treasurer, Project Coordinator and Media Coordinator. Elections are held every year.
Software Society comprises the President, Vice President, General Secretary, General Manager, Girls Representative, Extra-Curricular Activities Manager, Sports Manager, Finance Secretary, Event Secretary and EIT. This society on one hand has generated various extra curricular activities while on the other by organizing different seminars, workshops, lectures and short duration courses has contributed effectively to academic development.
 Information Security SocietyThis Society has been founded by the pioneer batch BEIS-01. This society comprises the President, General Secretary, Sports Secretary, Finance Secretary, Event Secretary. The main purpose of this society is to illustrate the importance of Cyber Security in this modern era. Society deals with all types of cyber-related seminars, workshops, and events held in MCS. In addition to this, the society's key focus is to help all the students of MCS to participate actively in all events organized by ISS.

Companies (Dorms)
There are two Companies for GC's, Liaqat Company and the Iqbal Company while Jinnah Company and GK hostel are for civilian Male Cadets. Fatima Company is for civilian female students.

Students 
There are seven different categories of students at college.

 Officers Pak Army Captains having served at least three and a half year after passing out from Pakistan Military Academy.
 Gentleman Cadets (GC's) Students who are enrolled in Pakistan Army. They enter the college after qualifying the ISSB Armed Forces selection test. Upon graduation from the college, the students spend one year at the Pakistan Military Academy to receive officer ranks. They undergo strict military training. They were also referred to as "Technical Cadets".
 NUST Cadets (NC's) Civilian students selected through the NUST entrance test (NET). They do not undergo any sort of military training. In addition, NUST also offers a limited number of seats to the international students.
 Paying Cadets (PC's) The wards of serving military personnel are given a chance to come and study at MCS. They are the "Paying Cadets".
 Additional Selected Cadets (ASC's) This category is an extension of PC scheme. The cadet should be a ward of a retired or a serving military personnel. There are about 20-25 ASC reserved seats at MCS.

Organization and administration 
The College of Signals is functionally and administratively controlled by the General Headquarters through Signals Directorate. It is headed by Major General/ Brigadier and is sub-divided into four functional groups.
Administrative Wing (Adm Wing) Comprises Administrative Branch (Administration and Quartering Sections), Training Branch, NUST Branch, Examination Branch and MCS Training Battalion.
Combat Wing (Cbt Wing) Comprises Tactical Branch, Telecommunication Branch, Security and Research Branch and Information Technology Branch.
Engineering Wing (Engg Wing) Comprises Electrical Engineering, Computer Software Engineering, Information Security, Humanities and Basic Sciences Departments and Library.
Research and Development Wing (R&D) Mostly focuses on research and development activities of the college.

Academics

Undergraduate program
MCS offers undergraduate degrees in three streams, namely Electrical Engineering, Computer Software Engineering & Information Security. Before 2019 batch, only Electrical Engineering in Telecommunication was offered. The program has now been converted to full Electrical Engineering. In 2020, the Bachelor's degree in Information Security was offered for the first time. Each year a standard NET (NUST Entrance Test) is conducted for undergraduate enrollment in these courses. The students are also enrolled via SAT subject tests.

Graduate program
The college also offers master's degrees in Electrical (Telecommunication) Engineering, Software Engineering, Information Security and Systems Engineering. The master's degrees also lead to PhD. Students are enrolled after passing the GAT (Graduate Assessment Test).

Departments
The college has four departments.
Department of Computer Software Engineering (al-Khawarizmi Block)
Department of Electrical Engineering (Shuja ul Qamar Block)
Department of Information Security
Department of Humanities and Basic Sciences (Sharif Block), named after a veteran Signals Officer Major Sharif, who was also father of Major Shabbir Sharif, who received Nishan-e-Haider(the Highest Military Award of Gallantry) and Ex-Pakistan Army Chief General Raheel Sharif.

Faculty
MCS has about seventy faculty members who are responsible for teaching both graduate and undergraduate courses. As of January 2022, Dr. Asif Masood is the acting dean of MCS. Dr. Adil Masood Siddiqui is the current Head of Electrical Department while Engr. Asim Bakhshi heads the Department of Computer Science and Dr. Abdul Razzaque is responsible for heading the Department of Humanities and Basic Sciences. Dr. Haider Abbas heads Department of Information Security while Dr. Adnan Ahmed Khan heads the Research department.

See also
National University of Science and Technology, Pakistan
Pakistan Military Academy
Army Medical College
College of Aeronautical Engineering
College of Electrical and Mechanical Engineering
Military College of Engineering (Pakistan)

References

External links

 MCS official website
NUST official website
Signalianz alumni website

National University of Sciences & Technology
Universities and colleges in Rawalpindi District
Military education and training in Pakistan
Training formations of Pakistan Army
Engineering universities and colleges in Pakistan
Military academies of Pakistan
Educational institutions established in 1947
1947 establishments in Pakistan
Pakistan Military Academy